Toshimitsu is a masculine Japanese given name.

Possible writings
Toshimitsu can be written using different combinations of kanji characters. Some examples:

敏光, "agile, light"
敏満, "agile, full"
敏三, "agile, three"
俊光, "talented, light"
俊満, "talented, full"
俊三, "talented, three"
利光, "benefit, light"
利満, "benefit, full"
利三, "benefit, three"
年光, "year, light"
年満, "year, full"
寿光, "long life, light"
寿満, "long life, full"

The name can also be written in hiragana としみつ or katakana トシミツ.

Notable people with the name
Toshimitsu Arai (新居 利光, born 1948), Japanese voice actor.
Toshimitsu Asai (浅井 俊光, born 1983), Japanese footballer.
Toshimitsu Deyama (出山 利三, born 1965), Japanese singer.
Toshimitsu Izawa (伊沢 利光, born 1968), Japanese golfer.
Toshimitsu Kai (born 1956), Japanese golfer.
Toshimitsu Motegi (茂木 敏充, born 1955), Japanese politician.
Toshimitsu Otsubo (大坪 利満, born 1945), Japanese ice hockey player.
Toshimitsu Saito (斎藤 利三, 1534–1582), Japanese samurai.
Toshimitsu Suetsugu (末次 利光, born 1942), Japanese baseball player.
Toshimitsu Tanaka (田中 利光, 1930–2020), Japanese composer.
Toshimitsu Teshima (手嶋 敏光, born 1942), Japanese cyclist.
Toshimitsu Yoshida (吉田 寿光, born 1963), Japanese football referee.

Japanese masculine given names